Admiral Henry Osborn (baptized 27 August 1694 – 4 February 1771) was a British naval officer who served as Commodore-Governor of Newfoundland. He was a younger son of Sir John Osborn, 2nd Baronet.

Naval career
Osborn joined the Royal Navy as a volunteer in 1710. He was promoted lieutenant in 1717, and his first command was HMS Squirrel in 1728.

On 14 May 1729, Osborn was appointed the first commodore-governor of Newfoundland, when Lord Vere Beauclerk, the naval commander of Newfoundland had declined. He visited all of the notable places on the island and divided it into six districts. Within each of the districts he appointed magistrates and constables. He served as Port Admiral at Portsmouth from 1756 to 1757.

In 1757, he was promoted Admiral of the Blue and appointed Commander-in-Chief, Mediterranean Fleet.

Battle of Cartagena

In late 1757 Osborn besieged the neutral port of Cartagena in Spain where a French squadron designed to go to the relief of Louisbourg had taken shelter. While there he attacked a small French squadron under Michel-Ange Duquesne de Menneville which was coming to the aid of the trapped force. Two French ships were captured, including Duquesne's flagship and it indirectly led to the successful British capture of Louisbourg later that year. The battle helped to restore the Royal Navy's reputation following the failed attempt to relieve Minorca two years earlier which had led to Admiral Byng's execution.

On 1 January 1763, he received the honorific post of Vice-Admiral of Great Britain. He entered Parliament in late 1758 for Bedfordshire in a by-election, sitting until 1761.

See also
 List of people from Newfoundland and Labrador

Notes

References

Further reading

1694 births
1771 deaths
British MPs 1754–1761
Members of the Parliament of Great Britain for English constituencies
Governors of Newfoundland Colony
Royal Navy admirals
Younger sons of baronets